David Walker (died March 1, 1820) was a U.S. Representative from Kentucky, brother of George Walker and John Walker and grandfather of James D. Walker. He was the father of Florida governor David S. Walker and the uncle of another Florida governor Richard Keith Call. Walker played a pivotal role in the upbringing of his nephew, taking in Call's widowed mother (Walker's sister) and her children after the death of Call's father.

Born in Brunswick County, Virginia, Walker attended public and private schools. He served in the Revolutionary War as a private under General Lafayette and was at the surrender of Cornwallis at Yorktown.
He moved to Logan County, Kentucky.
He served as clerk of county and circuit courts.
He served as member of the State house of representatives from 1793 to 1796.
He served as major on the staff of Governor Isaac Shelby of Kentucky in the Battle of the Thames during the War of 1812.

Walker was elected as a Democratic-Republican to the Fifteenth and to the succeeding Congress (March 4, 1817 – March 1, 1820). He died on March 1, 1820, in Washington, D.C. and was interred in the Congressional Cemetery.

See also
List of United States Congress members who died in office (1790–1899)

References

Year of birth unknown
1820 deaths
Burials at the Congressional Cemetery
People of Virginia in the American Revolution
Democratic-Republican Party members of the United States House of Representatives from Kentucky